Ruang is the southernmost stratovolcano in the Sangihe Islands arc. It comprises an island 4 × 5 km wide. The summit contains a partial lava dome, and reaches some 2,379 ft in altitude. From its summit, Klabat's peak in the south, that of Siau to the north, and Ternate to the east can all be seen.

Eruptions

The first recorded eruption was in 1808. Dr. Adolf Meyer witnessed a large eruption in 1871. Ruang was uninhabited at the time, but the inhabitants of nearby Tagulandang had many plantations on its slopes. The eruption destroyed these in minutes and caused a tsunami that obliterated most of their large village, situated on Tagulandang, opposite Ruang. Most of the village's inhabitants drowned, and their bodies could afterwards be seen on the beach.

See also 

 List of volcanoes in Indonesia

References 

Stratovolcanoes of Indonesia
Mountains of North Sulawesi
VEI-4 volcanoes
Active volcanoes of Indonesia
Holocene stratovolcanoes